Prabhabati Bose (née Dutta) was an Indian social activist and politician. She was born in 1869 into a respected Kayastha  Bharadwaja clan Dutta family of Hatkhola, in Calcutta North. Her parents were Ganganarayan Dutta and Kamala Kamini Dutta of Kashinath Dutta Road, Baranagore (a suburb of Calcutta), India. She was her parents' eldest daughter.

In 1880, at the age of 11, she was married off to Janakinath Bose who hailed from a Kulin Bose family from the village Kodalia (located near Sonarpur).

Marriage and children
Prabhabati and Janakinath Bose had fourteen children together. She was very involved in their education and many members of the extended Bose family made significant contributions to Indian society. Not only was Prabhabati the matriarch of Bose family, but following her parents' deaths she and her husband took care of her younger siblings.

She gave birth to fourteen children, six daughters and eight sons, among whom were nationalist leader Sarat Chandra Bose, Netaji Subhas Chandra Bose and distinguished cardiologist Dr. Sunil Chandra Bose.

Political activism
In 1928, Prabhabati was selected president of the Mahila Rashtriya Sangha.

References

1869 births
1943 deaths
Bengali Hindus
19th-century Bengalis
20th-century Bengalis
Bengali activists
Bengali politicians
People from Kolkata
People from Baranagar
Women from West Bengal
19th-century Indian women
19th-century Indian people
20th-century Indian women
20th-century Indian people
Indian activists
Indian women activists
Activists from West Bengal
Indian politicians
20th-century Indian women politicians